Philippe Nahon (24 December 1938 – 19 April 2020) was a French actor.

Best known films
Nahon was best known for his roles in French horror and thriller films, including I Stand Alone, Humains, Calvaire, The Pack and Haute Tension, and he has been featured as a nameless butcher in three films by Gaspar Noé – Carne, I Stand Alone, and Irréversible (cameo). He died from an illness made worse by COVID-19 on 19 April 2020.

Theater

Filmography

References

External links

1938 births
2020 deaths
French male film actors
Male actors from Paris
20th-century French male actors
21st-century French male actors
French male stage actors
French male television actors
Deaths from the COVID-19 pandemic in France